Ramin Djawadi (born 19 July 1974) is an Iranian-German score composer. He is known for his scores for the 2008 Marvel film Iron Man and the HBO series Game of Thrones, for which he was nominated for Grammy Awards in 2009, 2018 and 2020. He is also the composer for the HBO Game of Thrones prequel series, House of the Dragon (2022–present). He has scored films such as Clash of the Titans, Pacific Rim, Warcraft, A Wrinkle in Time, Iron Man and Eternals, television series including Prison Break, Person of Interest, Jack Ryan, and Westworld, and video games such as Medal of Honor, Gears of War 4, and Gears 5. He won two consecutive Emmy Awards for Game of Thrones, in 2018 for the episode "The Dragon and the Wolf" and in 2019 for "The Long Night".

Early life
Djawadi was born in Duisburg, to an Iranian father and a German mother. He went to Krupp Gymnasium in Duisburg, West Germany and studied at Berklee College of Music.

Career
After graduating from Berklee College of Music in 1998, Djawadi garnered the attention of Hans Zimmer, who recruited him to Remote Control Productions. Djawadi moved to Los Angeles and worked as an assistant to Klaus Badelt. From there on he made additional music and arrangements for Badelt and Zimmer movies, such as Pirates of the Caribbean: The Curse of the Black Pearl, The Time Machine, and the Academy Award-nominated film Something's Gotta Give. He co-composed the music for System Shock 2 (1999). In 2003, he and Badelt composed the score of Beat the Drum.

In 2004, Djawadi went out on his own with Blade: Trinity, collaborating with RZA for director David S. Goyer. This was the beginning of his relationship with Goyer for both film and television. The following year, Djawadi continued making additional music for Zimmer in films such as Batman Begins and The Island, which was his last time working in the background of another composer. The same year, he composed the Emmy-nominated main title themes and scores for Prison Break and the related show Breakout Kings.

In 2006, Djawadi scored the first Sony Pictures Animation project, Open Season, followed by the sequel Open Season 2 (2008). Djawadi's ethereal score for the film Mr. Brooks (2007) earned him a World Soundtrack Award for Discovery of the Year nomination. His other scores include Deception, Robert Towne's Ask the Dust, and Iron Man. Djawadi was nominated for Grammy Award for Best Score Soundtrack for Visual Media for his work on Iron Man'''.

Djawadi wrote the score for Goyer's horror thriller The Unborn (2009), produced by Michael Bay. Djawadi collaborated with Goyer on the television show FlashForward that year, earning him his second Emmy nomination.

In 2010, Djawadi completed Warner Brothers' Clash of the Titans. The same year, he scored the soundtrack for the video game Medal of Honor.

In 2011, he was selected to score HBO's fantasy drama Game of Thrones. His work on Game of Thrones has garnered him several industry awards and recognition including a Primetime Emmy Award for Outstanding Music Composition for a Series in September 2018 for the score "The Dragon and the Wolf". For his work on season 7, he was nominated for the Grammy Award for Best Score Soundtrack for Visual Media. This was his second nomination in this category after being nominated before for Iron Man in 2009. In 2011, he worked on the CBS crime drama Person of Interest.

In 2013, Djawadi composed for the science fiction film Pacific Rim. He scored FX's vampire drama The Strain, created by Pacific Rim director Guillermo del Toro.

In 2016, Djawadi composed for the fantasy film Warcraft and the HBO science fiction show Westworld. The same year, Djawadi composed the score for the fantasy action monster film The Great Wall.

Djawadi scored The Queen's Corgi, an animation film directed by frequent collaborator Ben Stassen. He co-wrote "Hollow Crown " alongside Ellie Goulding in For the Throne: Music Inspired by the HBO Series Game of Thrones. In 2019, he won his second Emmy Award in a row for the Game of Thrones episode "The Long Night".

In 2019, Djawadi also made the soundtrack for the Microsoft Studios and The Coalition video game, Gears 5. The soundtrack was copyrighted and cannot be used even while playing the game online. 

He received a third Grammy nomination for his work in season 8 of Game of Thrones, in the Grammy Award for Best Score Soundtrack for Visual Media category.

Djawadi composed the score for the 2021 Marvel Studios film Eternals, which marked his return to the Marvel Cinematic Universe (MCU) since 2008's Iron Man. Djawadi composed music for the trailer of Magic: The Gathering: Theros Beyond Death, a card game. Djawadi co-composed music with  Brandon Campbell for the second episode of Apple TV+'s series Amazing Stories titled "The Heat". He composed music for the Disney+'s nature documentary film Elephant. Djawadi composed the score for Lisa Joy's feature film debut Reminiscence. He also co-composed the music for the Amazon Game's New World with Brandon Campbell.

He scored the music for Ruben Fleischer's Uncharted based on the videogame franchise of same name. He reunited with Game Of Thrones creator D.B Weiss and Tom Morello, scoring the Netflix film, Metal Lords, directed by Peter Solliet. He scored Sony's The Man from Toronto, directed by Patrick Hughes and the Game Of Thrones prequel series, House Of the Dragon.''

Personal life
Djawadi is married to Jennifer Hawks, a music executive in the film industry. They are parents of twins. According to Djawadi, he experiences the perceptual phenomenon known as synesthesia whereby he may "associate colours with music, or music with colours", and it allows him to visualize music.

Works and awards

Tours 
 Game of Thrones Live Concert Experience (2017–2019)

See also 
 Music of Game of Thrones
 Music of the Marvel Cinematic Universe
 List of people with synesthesia

References

External links 

 
 
 

 
1974 births
Berklee College of Music alumni
German classical composers
German emigrants to the United States
German film score composers
German male classical composers
German people of Iranian descent
German record producers
German television composers
Living people
Male film score composers
Male television composers
Musicians of Iranian descent
People from Duisburg
Primetime Emmy Award winners
Video game composers